Luiz Eduardo Greenhalgh is a Brazilian politician and one of the founders of the Workers' Party (PT). He also was the attorney of the Landless Workers' Movement (MST).
A founding member of PT, Greenhalgh was affiliated 1974–1980 to the Brazilian Democratic Movement (MDB), the party that previously represented the civilian opposition to the dictatorship. He was federal deputy for São Paulo and vice mayor of São Paulo in the government of Luiza Erundina (1989–1993). He participated in the creation of a special committee, the Brazilian Committee of Solidarity with the Peoples of Latin America in 1980.

See also
Central Única dos Trabalhadores
Landless Workers' Movement

References

1948 births
Workers' Party (Brazil) politicians
Members of the Chamber of Deputies (Brazil) from São Paulo
Living people